Andrus Blok (born on 3 June 1961) is an Estonian politician and rally driver.

2010–2011, he was Chairman of People's Union of Estonia. Blok was the mayor of the former Rakke Parish.

In 1989 he won Estonian Championships in rally.

In 2006, he was awarded by the Order of the White Star, IV Class.

References

Living people
1961 births
People's Union of Estonia politicians
Estonian rally drivers
Recipients of the Order of the White Star, 4th Class
Mayors of places in Estonia